Carolina Amor de Fournier (1908–1993) was a Mexican editor, writer and translator. She was a founder of the Mexican scientific publishing company, La Prensa Médica Mexicana, and for many years, served as its director and editor. She was also co-founder in 1965 of Siglo XXI Editores. In 1980, she received the Merito Editorial. Born in Mexico City, her parents were Carolina Schmidtlein y García Teruel (of German and Spanish origin) and Emmanuel Amor Subervielle (of Spanish and French origin). Amor had six siblings. Her sister, Guadalupe Amor, was a poet, her sister, Inés Amor an important Mexican galerist and her niece, Elena Poniatowska Amor, was a writer. Amor died in Mexico City.

Selected works
Carolina amor de Fournier; Carlos campillo Sainz. 1987. A la memoria del Doctor Raoul Rournier Villada, 1900-1984. 
Andres J. Cassidy; Luz María A. de Chapa; Carolina Amor de fournier. 1982. "Es un privilegio ser amigo del Señor .
Carolina Amor de Fournier. 1972. La mujer en la tipografía mexicana.
Carolina Amor de Fournier. 1972. El niño de 6 a 12 años. 
Carolina Amor de Fournier. 1965. Medicina interna.
Carolina Amor de Fournier, Rafael Montes de Oca; Rafael Martín del Campo, Rorman Pelham Wright. 1963. Hummingbirds and orchids of Mexico Monografia de los colibries y apuntes sobre las principales orquidea de México.
Carolina Amor de Fournier. 1954. Catálogo de libros impresos en México: VI Feria mexicana del libro.

References

Sources
Claudia Albarrán, Juan Antonio Rosado, Angélica Tornero. 2004. Diccionario de literatura mexicana: siglo XX. Vol. 19 de Filosofía y Cultura Contemporánea. 2ª edición de UNAM, 530 pp. , 

1908 births
1993 deaths
Mexican editors
Mexican women editors
Writers from Mexico City
Mexican people of French descent
Mexican people of German descent
Mexican people of Spanish descent
Mexican translators
20th-century translators
20th-century Mexican women writers
20th-century Mexican writers
Media founders
Women founders